Paul Cross {born 31 October 1965) is an English former footballer who made 237 appearances in the Football League playing for Barnsley, Preston North End, Hartlepool United and Darlington.

Cross was a left back for Barnsley from 1983 to 1991. He progressed through the ranks of the youth side, finally achieving first team status under the management of local lad head-hunter, Allan Clarke. The defender owes much of his recognition to Eric Winstanley, a huge influence and early mentor of Cross.

Cross was plagued with injury early in his career but persevered at Barnsley until 1991 before moving to Hartlepool United when the chairmanship was under financial scrutiny.
Cross was joint-manager of Northern League club Crook Town between September 1997 and October 1998 alongside former Darlington teammate Kevan Smith.

Cross has been a frequent radio commentator on Northern Derby matches between Darlington and Hartlepool, both teams he has played for.

References 

Barnsley F.C. players
Living people
1965 births
Preston North End F.C. players
Hartlepool United F.C. players
Darlington F.C. players
Guisborough Town F.C. players
English Football League players
English footballers
Footballers from Barnsley
Association football defenders